In U.S. politics, an independent Democrat is an individual who loosely identifies with the ideals of the Democratic Party but chooses not to be a formal member of the party (chooses to be an independent) or is denied the Democratic nomination in a caucus or primary election. Independent Democrat is not a political party. Several elected officials, including members of Congress, have identified as independent  Democrats.

Active members

US Senate
Angus King
Bernie Sanders
Kyrsten Sinema

History
The first member of the United States House of Representatives to identify as an independent Democrat was Zadok Casey of Illinois, who served from 1833 to 1843. Casey was a Jacksonian Democrat before becoming an independent.

In 1848, a candidate for Mayor of Chicago, James Hutchinson Woodworth, labelled himself an independent Democrat to distance himself from what was at the time a corrupt and disorganized Chicago Democratic party organization; he preferred being described as an independent Democrat rather than as a Whig as that party was itself experiencing a transition. He won his first election by an overwhelming majority and then was re-elected for a second term. However his mayoral political success sealed his departure from any further association with the then Illinois Democratic party. When the Whigs in Illinois became the new Republican party, and he was able to confirm that his abolitionist ideals would be recognized, he registered as a member of the GOP. He subsequently was elected to the United States House of Representatives from Illinois as a member of the GOP. Woodworth served one term in Congress, and return to a banking career in Chicago that spanned the Civil War era and the Reconstruction.  

Andrew Jackson Hamilton, of western Texas, was an independent Democratic member of the United States House of Representatives, but did not run for re-election in 1860.     

Strom Thurmond of South Carolina was elected to the United States Senate in 1954 and served as an independent Democrat in the 84th Congress until his resignation on April 4, 1956. In November of that year he was elected as a Democrat to fill the vacancy created by his resignation. Thurmond later became a member of the Republican Party in 1964.

Harry F. Byrd Jr., a senator from Virginia, left the Democratic Party in 1970. He continued to caucus with the Democrats and referred to himself as an independent Democrat.

Patrick Lucey was a Democrat who ran as an independent as a vice-presidential candidate in 1980 with John B. Anderson.

David Orr, who served as Mayor of Chicago briefly, entered politics as an independent Democrat.

In the 2006 primary, Joseph Lieberman of Connecticut, a Democratic incumbent U.S. senator, lost the Democratic nomination for that office to entrepreneur Ned Lamont by a 52% to 48% margin. Lieberman created a new party called the Connecticut for Lieberman Party, obtained its nomination for the seat on the basis of signed petitions, and ran in the general election in November as its candidate—one of five on the ballot in that race. He won with 49.7% of the votes cast for the office. He had stated while campaigning that if elected he would to meet in caucus with the Democrats in the 110th United States Congress, and within the week following the election, he stated that he was "an Independent Democrat, capital I, capital D", and that he had specified as much to the secretary of the Senate. Throughout that Congress, he continued in that caucus (and it remained the majority caucus, with 51 or 50 members, complemented by the 49 or 48 Republicans caucusing together). , during the 111th Congress, Lieberman was annotated as "ID-CT" on the U.S. Senate's "contact information" web page for him, and with "Independent" in the "Party" column (for both the 110th and 111th Congresses) on Congress's "Biographical Directory of the U.S. Congress" page for him.

Four members of the New York State Senate, Jeffrey Klein, Diane Savino, David Valesky, and David Carlucci, indicated they would form a similarly designated caucus separate from the Democratic conference in 2011, known as the Independent Democratic Conference. Following the 2009 New York State Senate Leadership Crisis the IDC formed a coalition government with then New York Senate Republican leader Dean Skelos to give Republicans control of the New York State Senate. In April 2018 the IDC announced they would dissolve and following the primary defeat of six of the eight members in the 2018 election the chamber returned to Democratic control in 2019.

Bernie Sanders of Vermont, the longest-serving independent politician in congressional history, has caucused with the Democratic Party since 1995, in both his House and Senate runs. He has criticized the Democratic Party from a socialist perspective, though sought the Democratic nomination for president in 2016 and 2020.

Angus King served as Governor of Maine from 1995 to 2003, and was the only Independent governor in the U.S. during that period. He positioned himself as a centrist during his tenure, and later ran for Senate in 2012 on the same premise. He has caucused with Senate Democrats since 2013, and briefly considered caucusing with Republicans after the 2014 Senate elections.

Kyrsten Sinema of Arizona was elected as a Democrat in 2018, but in December 2022 switched her affiliation from Democrat to Independent, effective upon commencement of the 118th Congress. She has opted to caucus with neither party, though maintain her seniority and committee assignments through the Senate Democratic Caucus.

Congressional candidates such as Cara Mund, Evan McMullin, and Al Gross have all run as independents while receiving endorsements from their respective states' Democratic Parties.

See also 
 Blue Dog Coalition
 Conservative Democrat
 Independent Republican, the Republican Party counterpart.
 New Democrats
 Congressional Progressive Caucus
 National Democratic Party
 National Democratic Party of Alabama
 Straight-Out Democratic Party

References 

Democratic Party (United States)
Factions in the Democratic Party (United States)
 Democrat